Nicholas Leverett (born January 11, 1997) is an American football center for the Tampa Bay Buccaneers of the National Football League (NFL). He played college football at NC Central and Rice.

Personal life and high school
Nicholas Leverett was born on January 11, 1997, in Charlotte, North Carolina. He attended Concord High School and played football, baseball, and track and field while there. He was chosen to play in the North Carolina Shrine Bowl while at Concord High School.

College career
After finishing high school, Leverett attended North Carolina Central University. During his freshman year, Leverett chose to redshirt. In his redshirt freshman year, Leverett started all 12 games and earned 3rd team All-MEAC in that year. In his redshirt sophomore year, he started all 11 games and earned 2nd team All-MEAC. During his redshirt junior year, he again started all 11 games and earned 2nd team All-MEAC. He was also a distinguished recipient of the 2018 Allstate AFCA Good Works Team award, one of only 22 players to be recognized. Leverett transferred to Rice University and while there as a graduate transfer in his senior year was an All-Conference USA honorable mention. Also while at Rice, Leverett was selected to play in the College Gridiron All-Star Showcase.

Professional career

After going undrafted in the 2020 NFL Draft, Leverett was signed as an undrafted free agent by the Tampa Bay Buccaneers on May 5, 2020. He continued to be a member of the team, predominantly on the practice squad, until January 27, 2021. Leverett was briefly waived and later resigned onto the practice squad on February 10, 2021. However, this caused Leverett not to be a part of the team that won Super Bowl LV, which was on February 7.  Leverett was activated onto the active roster at the outset of the Buccaneers week 1 game against the Dallas Cowboys due to linebacker Cam Gill being placed on injured reserve.

References

Tampa Bay Buccaneers players
American football offensive guards
North Carolina Central Eagles football players
Rice Owls football players
1997 births
Living people